Yerkey is a surname. Notable people with the surname include:

 Gary G. Yerkey, American author and journalist
 Stephen Yerkey (born 1950), American singer-songwriter

See also
 Berkey
 Yerkes (surname)
 Yorkey